El Mundo Newspaper is a Spanish-language newspaper distributed in Austin and San Antonio. It is headquartered in Austin.

It began publication in 1990. It began serving other parts of the Central Texas region circa 2000 and its San Antonio services began in August 2004. It has a total circulation of 28,000.

It hosts a yearly "Back to School Fest" in Austin.

References

External links
 El Mundo

Spanish-language newspapers published in Texas
Hispanic and Latino American culture in Austin, Texas
Hispanic and Latino American culture in San Antonio
Newspapers published in Austin, Texas
Publications established in 1990
1990 establishments in Texas